Sarghi Jammu is a Punjabi author and academician. She was one of the finalists for the 2021 Dhahan Prize for her short-story collection Apne Apne Marseia.

Biography 
She is the daughter of Punjabi author Dalbir Chetan. She completed her PhD in Punjabi folklore and currently she is an assistant professor in Punjabi at Sri Guru Angad Dev College, Khadur Sahib, Tarn-Taran.

Works 

 Sam Drishti (2002)
 Khilrey Haraf (2003)
 Chetan Katha (2005)
 Vida Hon Toh Pehla (2009)
 Punjabi Kahani Vich Lokdhara Da Unsarn Te Rapuntar (2018)
 Apne Apne Marseia (2020)

Awards 

 2021 - Dhahan Prize Finalist for her book "Apne Apne Marseia"

References 

Living people
Year of birth missing (living people)
Punjabi-language writers

Writers from Punjab, India
Women writers from Punjab, India